Athletics competitions at the 2001 Central American Games were held at the Estadio La Pedrera in Guatemala City, Guatemala, between November 30 - December 3, 2001.

A total of 43 events were contested, 22 by men and 21 by women.

Medal summary

Gold medal winners were published.  Furthermore, results were compiled from various press archives,
especially from La Prensa Libre, Guatemala.  Moreover, athletics at the VII Central American Games is covered by La Nación, San José, Costa Rica, El Diario de Hoy, San Salvador, El Salvador, El Nuevo Diario, Managua, Nicaragua, and La Prensa, Panamá.  A complete list of medal winners can be found on the MásGoles webpage
(click on "JUEGOS CENTROAMERICANOS" in the low right corner).

Men

Women

Medal table (unofficial)

References

2001
2001 Central American Games
Central American Games
2001 Central American Games